Nocardioides opuntiae is a Gram-positive, aerobic, non-spore-forming and non-motile bacterium from the genus Nocardioides which has been isolated from rhizosphere soil from the cactus Opuntia ficus-indica var. sanboten from Jeju, Korea. Nocardioides opuntiae has a high GC-content.

References

External links
Type strain of Nocardioides opuntiae at BacDive -  the Bacterial Diversity Metadatabase	

opuntiae
Bacteria described in 2014